Collège Stanislas may refer to:

In France:
Collège Stanislas de Paris, Paris
, Nice
, Cannes

Outside France:
Collège Stanislas (Quebec), with two locations in Quebec, Canada
Stanislascollege,  Netherlands